"Lay Low" is the second single from Snoop Dogg's fifth studio album Tha Last Meal, released in March 2001. It features then-labelmate Master P, Nate Dogg, Butch Cassidy, and Tha Eastsidaz. It was produced by Dr. Dre and Mike Elizondo. The song received solid airplay and was featured on Snoop Dogg's Greatest Hits. The video features cameo appearances from Tha Dogg Pound's Kurupt and Soopafly. It was also directed by Hype Williams. The concept of the video has a mafia-like approach.

Charts

Weekly charts

Year-end charts

References 

2001 singles
Snoop Dogg songs
Song recordings produced by Dr. Dre
Gangsta rap songs
2000 songs
G-funk songs